The Super Tourenwagen Cup, or German Supertouring Championship, was a touring car racing series held between 1994 and 1999 in Germany.

The championship was established when BMW and Audi both left the Deutsche Tourenwagen Meisterschaft (DTM) in 1992, after the series had adopted the more expensive Class 1 Touring Cars rules.  STW would run to Super Touring regulations for the full six years of its existence.  The demise of the championship turned out to be the revival of the Deutsche Tourenwagen Masters (also abbreviated to DTM) in 2000, as the factory teams pulled out of the STW for the new series.  The STW was succeeded by its second level series, the Deutsche Tourenwagen Challenge, and later the ADAC Procar Series.

Full list of champions

Race winners

Driver Statistics

Manufactures Statistics

External links
 SuperTouring.co.uk
 SuperTouringRegister.com
 SuperTouringCars.net
 FIA STC Article 262